Youngia is a genus of Asian plants in the tribe Cichorieae within the family Asteraceae. There are several weedy species in the genus as well as the endangered Youngia nilgiriensis from Sispara in southern India, and Youngia japonica, which is also known as Japanese hawkweed.

Youngia was first described in 1831 by H. Cassini, and the genus was later united with Crepis. Taxonomic and cytogenetic studies by E. B. Babcock and G. Ledyard Stebbins led to the reclassification of the genus in the 1930s.

 Species

References

 
Asteraceae genera
Taxa named by Henri Cassini